Mount Maxwell Provincial Park is a provincial park in the Gulf Islands of British Columbia, Canada. It is located on Burgoyne Bay and the Sansum Narrows on the western shores of Saltspring Island.

It was established in 1938 for the views afforded from Baynes Peak, the highest point on the mountain, which encompass Vancouver Island, the Gulf Islands and mainland British Columbia. It has an area of 231 hectares, but is adjoined by the Mount Maxwell Ecological Reserve to the west, and Burgoyne Bay Provincial Park to the south, creating a contiguous area of over 1100 ha of protected land.

The mountain top can be accessed by gravel road, or by hiking trails from the north-east or Burgoyne Bay Provincial Park to the south. It has an elevation of 580m above sea level.

Mount Maxwell was initially named Mount Baynes by Admiralty surveyor George Henry Richards, after Admiral Sir Robert Lambert Baynes in about 1859. However, local inhabitants began calling it Mount Maxwell, a name which was officially accepted in 1911. When the park was created it was agreed to name the summit Baynes Peak.

Gallery

References

External links

Provincial parks of British Columbia
Salt Spring Island
1938 establishments in British Columbia
Protected areas established in 1938